Name of Christ may refer to:

Names and titles of Jesus in the New Testament
Names and titles of Jesus in the Quran
Holy Name of Jesus, refers to the theological and devotional use of the name of Jesus
Feast of the Name of Christ in the Lutheran church